Sweet is the fourth studio album released by American country music artist Ken Mellons. Released in 2004, it contains the song "Paint Me a Birmingham", which was also recorded by Tracy Lawrence and released as a single. Mellons's rendition was also released shortly before Lawrence's. "Smack Dab" was previously recorded by George Jones on his 1998 album It Don't Get Any Better Than This.

Track listing
"Smack Dab" (Kerry Kurt Phillips, T.W. Hale) – 3:02
"Just What I'm Wantin' to Do" (Ken Mellons, John Northrup) – 2:56
"Paint Me a Birmingham" (Buck Moore, Gary Duffy) – 3:48
"Climb My Tree" (Northrup, Billy Lawson, Dean Dillon) – 2:33
"Interstate Gypsy" (Mellons, Northrup, David Vowell) – 3:23
"You Can't Make My Heart Believe" (Mellons, Dillon, Northrup) – 3:39
"Sweet" (Walt Aldridge, Gary Baker, Greg Barnhill) – 4:00
"All I Need Is a Bridge" (Mellons, Northrup) – 4:24
"Single Again" (Billy Davis, David Rivers, Doug Graham) – 2:37
"Any Time, Any Place" (M.C. Potts, Northrup) – 3:11
"Institute of Honky Tonks" (Mellons, Northrup, Larry Alderman) – 3:03
Duet with George Jones 
"If I've Learned Anything at All" (Mellons, Northrup, Dale Dodson) – 2:35

Personnel
 Mike Chapman - bass guitar
 Larry Cordle - background vocals
 Glen Duncan - fiddle
 Terry Eldredge - background vocals
 Larry Franklin - fiddle
 Vince Gill - background vocals
 Owen Hale - drums
 Wes Hightower - background vocals
 Rebecca Lynn Howard - background vocals
 Bill Hullett - acoustic guitar
 Carl Jackson - banjo
 George Jones - background vocals
 Liana Manis - background vocals
 Brent Mason - electric guitar
 Ken Mellons - lead vocals
 Gordon Mote - keyboards
 John Wesley Ryles - background vocals
 Scotty Sanders - steel guitar
 Earl Scruggs - banjo
 Steve Turner - drums

References

[ Sweet] at Allmusic

2004 albums
Ken Mellons albums